The Mayor of New Plymouth is the head of municipal government of New Plymouth District, New Zealand. Since the 2022 local elections, the mayor is elected directly using the single transferable vote electoral system; prior to that, first-past-the-post voting was used. The current mayor is Neil Holdom.

List of office holders
James Clarke was the town's first mayor to die in office. He died in New Zealand's second fatal air crash; the three occupants of the plane he was in were killed on 11 November 1920. Clarke had foreshadowed that he intended to resign from the mayoralty that evening.

New Plymouth has had more than 20 mayors:

List of deputy mayors

References

External links
Information about the mayor and councillors on the New Plymouth District Council website

 
New Plymouth
1876 establishments in New Zealand